The 2003 Bulldogs RLFC season was the 69th in the club's history. Coached by Steve Folkes and captained by Steve Price, they competed in the NRL's 2003 Telstra Premiership, finishing the regular season 3rd (out of 15), and making the finals after finishing the previous season with the wooden spoon due to salary cap breaches. The Bulldogs went on to come within one game of the 2003 NRL Grand final but were knocked out by the Sydney Roosters.

Players
The Bulldogs' status for the 2003 season:

Departing players: Darren Smith (retired), Paul Rauhihi (North Queensland).

On contract: Braith Anasta, Roy Asotasi, Hazem El Masri, Jamie Feeney, Tony Grimaldi, Glenn Hall, Ben Harris, Corey Hughes, Glen Hughes, Shane Marteene, Willie Mason, Travis Norton, Mark O'Meley, Luke Patten, Adam Perry, Steve Price, Steve Reardon, Andrew Ryan, Brent Sherwin, Willie Talau, Johnathan Thurston, Matt Utai, Nigel Vagana (two to be added).

Off contract: Gavin Lester, Brett Howland, Dennis Scott, Nathan Sologinkin.

Results

Ladder

See also
List of Canterbury-Bankstown Bulldogs seasons

References

Canterbury-Bankstown Bulldogs seasons
Bulldogs RLFC season